Kusumavati Deshpande (Devanagari: कुसुमावती देशपांडे) (1904–1961) was a Marathi writer from Maharashtra, India.

She was born on 10 November 1904 in Amravati, Bombay Presidency, her maiden having been Kusum Jaywant. Her father was a lawyer.

After finishing her high school education at Huzurpaga (HHCP) girls' school in Pune in 1921, she studied for four years in Fergusson College, also in Pune, before moving to Nagpur and receiving her B.A. degree from Nagpur University in 1926. She went to the UK to receive in 1929 a B.A. in English literature from Westfield College in London. The same year she married Atmaram Ravaji Deshpande alias Kavi Anil and took the name  Kusumavati Deshpande.

For over 25 years since 1931, Deshpande taught English literature at Nagpur University. She also served as the Chief Producer, Women and Children's Programmes at All India Radio, and as the Convenor of the Advisory Board for the Sahitya Akademi on Marathi literature.

Literary works
Deshpande's critical essays on Marathi literature were published in two volumes as Marathi Kadambariche Pahile Shatak (मराठी कादंबरीचे पहिले शतक) in 1954 by the Sahitya Akademi.

Four collections of her short essays and short stories have been published:
 Deepakali (दीपकळी) (1934)
 Deepadan (दीपदान) (1940)
 Moli (मोळी) (1945) 
 Pasang (पासंग) (1954)

A collection of letters between Deshpande and her husband have been published under the title Kusumanil (कुसुमानिल).

Deshpande presided over Marathi Sahitya Sammelan in Gwalior in 1961. (Her husband had presided over the event in 1958.) She was the first female president of the annual Sammelan since its inception in 1878. (Following her, there have been four more female presidents until now.)

References

kusum avati deshpande

Marathi-language writers
1904 births
1961 deaths
People from Amravati
Academic staff of Rashtrasant Tukadoji Maharaj Nagpur University
Date of death missing
Place of death missing
Presidents of the Akhil Bharatiya Marathi Sahitya Sammelan